was a photographer whose work in the late 1920s and early 1930s in and near Tottori, where he lived, made him a major figure in Japanese pictorialism. 

Despite living far from any metropolis, Shiotani was famous among photographers nationwide. He portrayed landscapes, seascapes, priests at a local temple, his family, and other quotidian matters and scenes; his images at times unmediated, at others exploiting lens aberration or using darkroom effects. Among the photographers directly influenced by him was Shōji Ueda, who lived nearby.

As ideals and fashions in photography changed, Shiotani's work was largely forgotten in postwar Japan until interest was reawakened by a 1975 book devoted to his work; he later became known outside Japan thanks to an exhibition of Japanese photography that toured Europe from 1979 to 1982. Many prints made by Shiotani survive in museum collections, and since 2016 four photobooks largely or exclusively dedicated to his work have been published in Japan.

Life and career

Early life

Sadayoshi Shiotani (Shiotani Sadayoshi) was born on 24 October 1899 in Akasaki (since 2004 part of Kotoura), Tottori, to a family who owned a shipping agency. He was the eldest son of the sixth patriarch; the fifth, his grandfather, had held various important civic posts, and had some interest in photography.

As a young boy, Shiotani enjoyed drawing and was good at it. When he was 12 or 13, he received a  camera. Equipped with a simple meniscus lens, this folding camera used 127 film, a small format for the time, and was marketed as sufficiently compact to fit in a vest pocket and was popular in Japan. When Shiotani was 14, he participated in a photography event at Karo harbour in Tottori.

From 1912, Shiotani attended Kurayoshi Agricultural High School (now ). Powerfully built, he did well at judo. He graduated in 1917, whereupon he became serious about photography. Like other users of the Vest Pocket Kodak, the teenage Shiotani was embarrassed when serious amateur photographers saw him using it; he soon supplemented it with a large format (90×130 mm) camera with a Carl Zeiss Tessar lens.

Shiotani's fellow photographers formed the Kōei Club in 1919, with over two hundred members. (Kōei, means "light and shade".) Shiotani's first known attendance in a Kōei meeting was in 1921, and photographs of his appeared in its magazine Kōei from 1922. Hokutō Saigō, the key figure in Kōei, greatly encouraged Shiotani.

Shiotani became an enthusiastic user of the Vest Pocket Kodak, and in 1919 set up the "Vest Club" (i.e. Perhaps thanks to his grandfather, he was freed from a career in the family shipping business and instead allowed to pursue photography.

The aim was geijutsu shashin, which, depending on context, could be translated as "artistic", "art", "salon" or "pictorialist" photography. The meniscus lens of the Vest Pocket Kodak did not permit detail, and photographers using it – notably Masataka Takayama, Mitsugi Arima and Kōyō Yasumoto – would often remove an aperture limiter from around its lens (fūdo hazushi), thereby not only increasing the aperture by about two stops but also greatly softening the focus. Shiotani was attracted by the misty results and their resemblance to the works of a painter from Tottori whom he respected highly, .

In 1922, Shiotani married Sadako Inoue (1905–1988). They had three sons, Sōnosuke (b. June 1923), Reiji (November 1926 – March 1927) and Makoto (August 1940 – September 1945); and two daughters, Yūko (b. February 1930) and Yōko (b. July 1934).

Prominence
His Shadow (Kage) appeared in the March 1925 issue of Camera. As editor of both magazines,  realized that Shiotani was unusually talented.

In August 1925, Shiotani and four other photographers made a trip around the coasts of Shimane Prefecture: Kaka, Konami, Mihonoseki, and particularly . Much later, Shiotani told Shōji Ueda:

We took photographs for three days and I thought we would die. . . . During that trip we didn't encounter a single woman. There were no inns; we just wrapped ourselves in straw mats and kept on walking. Finally we managed to get some curry and rice with duck eggs and it was delicious.

Despite these hardships, a number of photographs Shiotani took on the trip soon appeared in magazines. His Bird's-Eye View of a Village (Mura no chōkan) was published in the March 1926 issue of Geijutsu Shashin Kenkyū. It was influenced by Picasso and Braque's paintings from L'Estaque (which Shiotani knew of via the writings of Nakajima), and also Maeta's paintings of Paris. In 1926, he won the first prize in the first contest ever run by Asahi Camera, with Fishing Village (Gyoson), a photograph of Takohana.

From 1925 to 1927, Shiotani was also one of the key members of a group of photographers that in 1928 formally became the Japan Photography Association (Nihon Kōga Kyōkai). A successor to the Japan Photographic Art Association (Nihon Kōga Geijutsu Kyōkai), this published a magazine (Gashū) and an annual, and held meetings and exhibitions. It was open to expressive distortions made with the camera, in the darkroom, or to the print: in addition to removing the aperture limiter from around the lens of a Vest Pocket Kodak, this might include deforming the printing paper under the enlarger, wiping prints with darker oil, and selectively removing this or adding powder to lighten areas. The work of Shiotani and the three other key members – Yamamoto, Takayama and Watanabe – was highly regarded by Nakajima, whose publications made their work well known (and who in 1933 published a how-to guide for the Vest Pocket Kodak).

Shiotani became a leading figure in photography in the San'in region, and known nationwide: although Tottori had the lowest population of any of Japan's 47 prefectures, it was influential; in 1927 it had the fifth largest number of members of photography organizations, behind only Tokyo, Osaka, Hyōgo (including Kobe) and Kyoto.

Tomoko Takeuji identifies the 1929 photograph Boy Priest Sitting as the point at which Shiotani matured as a photographer. This was published as a contest winner  in the September 1929 issue of Geijutsu Shashin Kenkyū, where Kenkichi Nakajima praised it for its lack of gimmickry and for its calm. Both Kometani and the younger photographer Eiichi Sakurai also praised it. The photograph shows the then 15-year-old priest Kōsen Daigaku, who had been at the Sōtō temple Kaizō-ji, near Shiotani's house, for less than a year; he was very lonely there but his dignity led Shiotani to make many portraits of him. Shiotani also photographed the other child priests and the chief priest at the temple, of which Shiotani was the chief parishioner.

Shiotani attributed his new appreciation of religious motifs to the death in infancy of his second son, Reiji. As well as photographing people at the temple, he took many photographs of his first son, Sōnosuke, and his daughter, Yūko. As he emerged from mourning, Shiotani enjoyed and depicted their vitality and naïve innocence.

Shiotani lived his whole life in the family house in Akasaki, which is on the sea; the upstairs room provided an excellent view of the sea, and Shiotani took many photographs of it from his window. He was fascinated by the sea's changeability, and his subject matter expanded from everyday life to the power of nature. Takeuji and Noriko Tsutatani both single out Shipwreck (Hasen, 1929) as a powerful seascape. Takeuji points out that it is very different from the "nostalgic landscape photography" popular at the time, but that its depiction of the wrecked ship and its horrified spectators also avoids expressing emotion and instead shows natural forces at work.

Shiotani calculated that his photography from 1915 to 1935 had added up in the following way: still lifes, 2.5 (out of 10); human figures, 2.8; scenery, 3.6; animals, 1.1. On various occasions he wrote of both the importance to him of nature photography, and the childishness of evaluating the landscapes that one sees. Also, that merely showing the exterior of "a piece of grass or a tree" was insufficient, and that the photographer "should attempt to capture the inner life hidden in its nature and to express it".

One of Shiotani's better-known photographs is View with Weather Forecast (Tenki yohō no aru fūkei) of 1931. According to Shiotani's own account, he took the original photograph from his window, using his Vest Pocket Kodak. He trimmed it, and held the photographic paper curved during exposure under the enlarger, "rendering the feeling of that day of hard winds and stressing my first impression by [adjusting] the deformation of the curve". This exaggerated the convexity of the horizon, but Shiotani's manipulations continued: he bleached part of the sky area to emphasize the clouds, applied soot and oils to darken areas, and used an ink eraser to emphasize the white of the waves. The photograph was submitted for a contest in the January 1932 issue of The Photo-Times; it won first prize, but only after the magazine's critic, Sakae Tamura, had said that it was unsatisfactory as submitted and had had its left and right edges trimmed.

View with Weather Forecast is not unusual in Shiotani's oeuvre in its altered proportions. View with a Tunnel (Tonneru no aru fūkei) of 1930 is known both with horizontal compression (as shown here) and without. Although it has a "pastoral atmosphere" without the compression, one has "a sense of unease" when viewing the compressed version. Alterations such as those used by Shiotani were widely used by the Surrealists for a disorienting effect, and Takeuji surmises from this and from Shiotani's occasional photography of cemeteries and human bones that he may have been an early exponent of Surrealism in Japanese photography, although Surrealism in the visual arts was little known in Japan until later (1937) and the degree of Shiotani's awareness of Surrealist trends overseas is unknown.

Shiotani regarded himself as lucky to live in the provincial area of San'in, with its sea, sand dunes, rivers, Mt. Daisen and Mt. Senjō. Moreover, it had become an area of photographic excellence and experimentation. Younger photographers from the area followed in Shiotani's footsteps: most notably Yasuo Iwasa, and a little later Shōji Ueda, who went on to enjoy great success. Among the legends about Shiotani was that he was such a perfectionist that retouching just two square centimetres of a print could occupy him for a whole day. Ueda stated that Shiotani's rate of success in contests and his skills made him something like a god.

Withdrawal

Shiotani gradually reduced his participation in photography at the national level during the 1930s. The last appearances of his photographs in Asahi Camera and The Photo-Times were in the October 1932 and June 1934 issues respectively. A series of twelve articles by him on techniques for The Photo-Times ended in September 1935. Takeuji surmises that this gradual withdrawal was because his geijutsu photography was becoming eclipsed by the newer trend of more expressly modernist . In the mid 30s, Shiotani returned to photographs he had taken from 1923 to 1925, printing them with less detail than previously, for an abstract and dreamlike effect. A notable example is Bird's-Eye View of a Village of 1934.

In 1938, the Vest Club was renamed Shakenkai, and Shiotani continued to participate in it. (Its meetings are known to have continued until September 1942, and in October 1949 it was revived in Shiotani's house.) After the war, Shiotani opened a photo studio next to his house and also continued photographing for his own interest, remaining faithful to his earlier subject matter but making rather larger prints than before and avoiding darkroom manipulation and retouching. He participated in some local exhibitions, but also submitted his prints to the exhibitions in Tokyo of the art organization Shinkyō.

Later years
The emphasis by postwar Japanese photography publishing on the documentary rendered outmoded geijutsu photography as had been practised by Shiotani (and rendered "New Photography" outmoded as well). However, a 1968 exhibition of the first hundred years of Japanese photography "effectuated a great turning point in how photography was understood [in Japan] and established a comprehensive canon of photographers, thereby rewriting the history of Japanese photography": although it included no photograph by Shiotani, it did display 56 examples of geijutsu photography of the period.

Shiotani was hospitalized from December 1974 to March 1975. The following month he had a one-man exhibition, Album 1923–1973, in the Asahi Pentax Gallery in Tokyo. If the 1968 exhibition had revived public interest in pictorialist photography, then the book Album 1923–1973, published in the autumn of 1975 and the first book devoted to Shiotani, made his photography widely known again, as well as prompting its acquisition by several museums. Edited by Shiotani's great admirer Shōji Ueda and printed and published in Yonago (Tottori), this was later one of only four books of pre-1945 photography to be profiled in Ryūichi Kaneko and Ivan Vartanian's survey Japanese Photobooks of the 1960s and '70s.

During a visit to Japan in 1978, Lorenzo Merlo, head of the Canon Amsterdam gallery, encountered Album 1923–1973; the book so impressed him that Shiotani was included among "Eight Masters of the Twentieth Century" in an exhibition that was first shown in Bologna in 1979 and that subsequently travelled around Europe. During a stay in Japan in 1981, who was planning photography exhibitions for Photokina, visited Shiotani in Akasaki; the next year, Shiotani exhibited, with 17 others, in Fotografie 1922–1982, held as part of Photokina. Curated by Heiting and described by the reviewer for Popular Photography as "the pièce de résistance of the [Photokina] picture shows, without a doubt" and a "magnificent exhibition", this presented Shiotani, Eliot Porter and Jean Dieuzaide as three exponents of the Pencil of Nature. Susumu Shiotani accepted a crystal obelisk at Photokina on his grandfather's behalf.

Shiotani's inclusion in Photofest 1988 (Museum of Fine Arts, Houston) led to a solo exhibition that toured seven US cities until 1990; a review of it said that Akasaki:

is [Shiotani's] ancestral home, a fishing village in the Tottori Prefecture of central Japan, and his entire world. [. . .] The images are somehow gentle, like the passing of one season into the next or the process of growing older, a change that is never harsh or self-proclamatory – you just simply notice it one day. He has focused on the landscape, the people and the objects they use, framing them into harmonious compositions and imbuing them with affection.

From 1973 to 1983, Shiotani often contributed to 's quarterly magazine Kōdai.

The Vest Pocket Kodak and large-format camera were not the only cameras Shiotani used – in 1975, he wrote that he was still using the former but also a Piccolette and a Rolleicord – but in his eighties he continued to use the lens of the Vest Pocket Kodak, attached to a Pentax Spotmatic 35 mm camera.

Shiotani said to his fellow photographers:

You have to look for beauty close to hand. It is important that you find beauty in ordinary, daily life; there is no need to travel long distances to photograph. Subjects exist all around you. You must sharpen your sensitivity and discover the beauty in your local environment.

Shiotani died on 28 October 1988.

Legacy

In 2014, hundreds of prints from the Shiotani family's collection, and many other related materials, were donated to the Shimane Art Museum. According to the chief curator of the museum, "His work [had] been meticulously preserved for eighty years, this miraculous collection remaining in perfect condition." The Tottori Prefectural Museum also has a large number of his prints. , six books largely or completely devoted to his work have been published in Japan.

In April of the same year, the  opened in a building of the Shiotani family's in Akasaki. It is run by a nonprofit organization, the Shiotani Teikō Photo Project. Constructed in 1874, this two-storey building was registered as a Tangible Cultural Property of Japan in November 2017.

Awards
Photokina Prize of Honor, 1982.
Tottori Prefecture Education Prize (Tottori-ken kyōiku shō), 1982.
Regional Cultural Merits Award (Chiiki-bunka kōrōsha Monbu-daijin hyōshō), 1983.
Distinguished Contributions award, Photographic Society of Japan awards, 1983.
Honorary citizen of Kotoura, 2010 (Kotoura-machi meiyo chōmin jushō), 2010.

Exhibitions

Solo exhibitions
Shiotani Teikō sakuhin-ten (Exhibition of works of Teikō Shiotani). Akasaki Agricultural Management Center (Akasaki Nōgyō Kanri Sentā), Akasaki, September 1971. 200 works.
Shiotani Teikō kaiko-ten (Teikō Shiotani retrospective exhibition). Yonago Art Gallery U, Yonago, Tottori. October 1971. 50 works. (The gallery belonged to Shōji Ueda.)
Shiotani Teikō meisaku-ten "Album 1923–1973" (<Album 1923–1973>; Exhibition of celebrated works by Teikō Shiotani, Album 1923–1973). Pentax Gallery, Tokyo, April 1975. In conjunction with publication of a photobook.
Uminari no fūkei (Scenery of the sound of the sea). Ginza Nikon Salon, Ginza, Tokyo; followed by Shinjuku Nikon Salon, Shinjuku, Tokyo; and Osaka Nikon Salon, Osaka. 1984. In conjunction with publication of a photobook.
The Photography of Teikoh Shiotani, organized by the Center for Contemporary Arts of Santa Fe,"a solo exhibition of [Shiotani's] work, which toured seven cities in the United States including Los Angeles, Detroit and Santa Fe until 1990."
Bijutsukan wo kangaeru 365-hi: Tottori kenritsu hakubutsukan shozō bijutsuhin-ten: Yonago-ten: Shashinka Shiotani Teikō no sekai 1 (Thinking about art galleries 365 days: Exhibition of the artworks in Tottori prefectural museum collections: Yonago exhibition: The world of the photographer Teikō Shiotani, 1). Yonago City Museum of Art, July–August 2000.
Bijutsukan wo kangaeru 365-hi: Tottori kenritsu hakubutsukan shozō bijutsuhin-ten: Kurayoshi-ten: Shashinka Shiotani Teikō no sekai 2 (Thinking about art galleries 365 days: Exhibition of the artworks in Tottori prefectural museum collections: Kurayoshi exhibition: The world of the photographer Teikō Shiotani, 2). , Kurayoshi, Tottori, July–August 2000.
Bijutsukan wo kangaeru 365-hi: Tottori kenritsu hakubutsukan shozō bijutsuhin-ten: Tottori-ten Part 7: Shashinka Shiotani Teikō no sekai (Thinking about art galleries 365 days: Exhibition of the artworks in Tottori prefectural museum collections: Tottori exhibition part 7: The world of the photographer Teikō Shiotani). Tottori Prefectural Museum, Tottori city, February–March 2001.
Shiotani Teikō shashin-ten (Shiotani Teiko photography exhibition). , Kotoura, Tottori, 2010.
Shiotani Teikō kaiko-ten = Teiko Shiotani's Retrospective. Manabi Town Tōhaku exhibition hall (Kotoura, Tottori), November 2011.
Shiotani Teikō sakuhin-ten (Exhibition of the works of Teikō Shiotani). Manabi Town Tōhaku exhibition hall, Kotoura, Tottori, November 2012.
Shiotani Teikō sakuhin-ten "Furusato to shizen wo shitau: Part II" (Exhibition of the works of Teikō Shiotani: Longing for where I come from, and nature). Teiko Shiotani Memorial Photo Gallery, October 2014 – March 2015.
Shirarezaru Nihon geijutsu shashin paionia Shiotani Teikō shashin = Teiko Shiotani: Pioneer of Artistic Photography in Japan. Photo History Museum, Fujifilm Square, Tokyo, May–July 2015.
Shiotani Teikō no shijō (The poetic sentiment of Teikō Shiotani). Teiko Shiotani Memorial Photo Gallery, April–September 2015.
Geijutsu toshite no shashin = Pictorialism. Teiko Shiotani Memorial Photo Gallery, October 2015 – March 2016.
Geijutsu-shashin no jidai: Shiotani Teikō-ten = Shiotani Teiko 1899–1988. Mitaka City Gallery of Art, Mitaka, Tokyo, August–October 2016. Accompanied by a catalogue.
Kurashikku foto no tanoshimi (The enjoyment of classic photos). Teiko Shiotani Memorial Photo Gallery, April–September 2016.
Shashin no bikan (The beauty of photographs). Teiko Shiotani Memorial Photo Gallery, October 2016 – March 2017.
Itoshiki mono e: Shiotani Teikō 1899–1988 = To Things Beloved: Shiotani Teikō 1899–1988. Shimane Art Museum (Matsue, Shimane), March–May 2017. Accompanied by a catalogue.
Shizen no kokoro, watakushi no kokoro (Nature's mind, my mind). Teiko Shiotani Memorial Photo Gallery, April–September 2017.
Geijutsu shashin no ajiwai (The taste of art photography). Teiko Shiotani Memorial Photo Gallery, October 2017 – March 2018.
Yasashisa no jōkei (Scenes of gentleness). Teiko Shiotani Memorial Photo Gallery, April–September 2018.
Shashin no omomuki (The grace of photographs). Teiko Shiotani Memorial Photo Gallery, October 2018 – March 2019.
Geijutsu shashin no 100-nen (I) (100 years of art photography (I)). Teiko Shiotani Memorial Photo Gallery, April–September 2019.
Geijutsu shashin no 100-nen (II) (100 years of art photography (II)). Teiko Shiotani Memorial Photo Gallery, October 2019 – March 2020.
Seitan 120-nen kinen: Shiotani Teikō (120th anniversary of birth: Teikō Shiotani). Shimane Art Museum, August–November 2019. Accompanied by publication of a book.
Seitan 120-nen: Geijutsu-shashin no kamisama Shiotani Teikō to sono jidai = The Legend in Art Photography: Teikoh Shiotani and His Contemporaries. Tottori Prefectural Museum, Tottori City, November–December 2019. Accompanied by a catalogue.
Furusato to shashin (The old village and photographs). Teiko Shiotani Memorial Photo Gallery, April–September 2020.
Dō to sei no bi (The beauty of movement and stillness). Teiko Shiotani Memorial Photo Gallery, October 2020 – March 2021.
Oto o kanaderu shashin (Photographs playing sounds). Teiko Shiotani Memorial Photo Gallery, April–September 2021.
Monokuro ni miru shikisai (Colours seen in monochrome). Teiko Shiotani Memorial Photo Gallery, October 2021 – March 2022.
Kaze no yuragi (Swaying in the wind). Teiko Shiotani Memorial Photo Gallery, April–September 2022.

Joint exhibitions
The list is selective, and omits mention of any of the exhibitions between 1926 and 1940. The chronologies provided in the 21st-century books about Shiotani give more information.
Dai-ikkai besutan-ha Kōdai ten (First new besu-tan group Kōdai exhibition). Pentax Gallery, Tokyo, 1973.
Fotografia Giapponese dal 1848 ad Oggi. Galleria d'Arte Moderna, Bologna, January–February 1979. Travelling to Palazzo Reale (Milan), Palais des Beaux Arts (Brussels), ICA (London), in 1979; Museum für Kunst und Gewerbe (Hamburg), Gemeentemuseum (Arnhem), Pulchri Studio (Gemeentemuseum, The Hague),  (Stockholm),  (Paris), in 1980;  (Helsinki), Kunstgewerbemuseum (Zürich), in 1981; Jerusalem, in 1982. Included works by Shiotani as one of "Eight Masters of the Twentieth Century" (the others being Eikoh Hosoe, Ikkō Narahara, Kishin Shinoyama, Issei Suda, Haruo Tomiyama, Hiromi Tsuchida and Shōji Ueda). Accompanied by a book in Italian and one in English.
Fotografie 1922–82 = Photography 1922–82. Photokina, Josef-Haubrich-Kunsthalle, Cologne, September–October 1982. With Walter Peterhans, Otto Steinert, František Drtikol, Paul Outerbridge, Helmut Newton, Edward Weston, Ansel Adams, Frederick Sommer, Robert Frank, Charles Sheeler, Luigi Ghirri, André Thijssen, Eliot Porter, Jean Dieuzaide. Accompanied by a catalogue.
Shiotani Teikō, Ueda Shōji shashin-ten (Teikō Shiotani and Shōji Ueda photograph exhibition).
The Art of Modern Japanese Photography. Photofest 1988. Museum of Fine Arts, Houston, February–March 1988. Three simultaneous exhibitions: one of Shiotani (which proceeded to tour the US), one of Shōji Ueda, and The Art of Modern Japanese Photography, of work from 1920 to 1940 by 29 photographers, Shiotani (and Ueda) among them.
Geijutsu shashin no jidai: Yonago Shayūkai kaikoten: Taishō makki — Shōwa shoki (The age of art photography: Retrospective exhibition of the Yonago Photography Circle: From the end of Taishō to early Shōwa). Yonago City Museum of Art, Yonago, Tottori, 1990. Five prints by Shiotani. Accompanied by a catalogue.
Modern Photography in Japan 1915–1940. Ansel Adams Center, San Francisco. June–September 2001. Four prints by Shiotani. Accompanied by a catalogue.
Shashin hyōgen no senkusha-tachi Shiotani Teikō, Ueda Shōji, Iwamiya Takeji, Kijima Takashi (Teikō Shiotani, Shōji Ueda, Takeji Iwamiya, Takashi Kijima: Pioneers of photographic expression). Tottori Prefectural Museum (Tottori City), March–April 2013.
Ueda Shōji to sono jidai: Seitan 100-nen (Shōji Ueda and his time: 100th anniversary of his birth). Shimane Art Museum, April–July 2013.
Japan Modern: Photography from the Gloria Katz and Willard Huyck Collection, curated by Carol Huh. Freer Gallery of Art and Arthur M. Sackler Gallery, Smithsonian Institution, Washington, D.C. September 2018 – January 2019.

Collections
Tokyo Photographic Art Museum. Ten prints.
Yonago City Museum of Art.
Shimane Art Museum (Matsue, Shimane).
Tottori Prefectural Museum (Tottori City).
Mitaka City Gallery of Art (Mitaka, Tokyo).
Yokohama Museum of Art. Ten prints.
Fujifilm Photo Collection (Tokyo). One print.
Museum of Fine Arts, Houston. Five prints.
J. Paul Getty Museum (Brentwood, Los Angeles). Seven prints.
Freer Gallery of Art and Arthur M. Sackler Gallery, Smithsonian Institution (Washington, DC). One print.

Publication of Shiotani's works

Books largely devoted to Shiotani

Shiotani Teikō meisakushū: 1923–1973 = Album 1923–1973: Teikoh Siotani. Yonago, Tottori: Nihon Shashin Shuppan, 1975. Edited by Shōji Ueda; with texts by Shiotani, Ueda,  and Eiichi Sakurai. ; . Despite the alternative title in English, captions and texts are in Japanese only. Publication was accompanied by an exhibition.
Uminari no fūkei: Shiotani Teikō shashinshū = Teikoh Shiotani Portfolio 1923–1973. Nikon Salon Books 10. Tokyo: Nikkor Club, 1984. ; . Despite the alternative title in English, text and captions are in Japanese only. With 95 plates (each on its own page), essays, an interview and other material; edited by Jun Miki. Publication (distribution to members of the Nikkor Club) was accompanied by an exhibition.
Geijutsu shashin no jidai: Shiotani-Teikō-ten katarogu = The Age of Art Photography: Shiotani Teiko Exhibition Catalogue. Mitaka, Tokyo: Mitaka City Gallery of Art and Mitaka City Sports and Culture Foundation, 2016. The catalogue of an exhibition. One hundred plates; all texts in both Japanese and English. Edited by Yūichirō Asakura and Yuki Ōtake; translated by Yukari Nakayama and Tim Groves. . .
Itoshiki mono e: Shiotani Teikō: 1899–1988 = To things beloved: Shiotani Teikō 1899–1988. Over three hundred plates; most texts in both Japanese and English but some in Japanese only. Edited by Noriko Tsutatani; translated by Gavin Frew. Matsue, Shimane: Shimane Art Museum, 2017. . . The catalogue of an exhibition.
Yume no kageri: Shiotani Teikō no shashin 1899–1988 = Teiko Shiotani. Edited by Noriko Tsutatani. Tokyo: Kyūryūdō, 2019. . With 136 plates by Shiotani. For each plate, the caption and the name of the collection from which the print comes are provided in both Japanese and English; all other text is in Japanese only. Not a catalogue, but its publication accompanied an exhibition. 
Seitan 120-nen geijutsu-shashin no kamisama Shiotani Teikō to sono jidai = The Legend in Art Photography: Teikoh Shiotani and His Contemporaries. [Yonago, Tottori]: Imai Shuppan, 2019. . The catalogue of an exhibition. With 128 pages of plates by Shiotani. For each plate, a caption is provided in both Japanese and English; all other text is in Japanese only.

Other appearances
A selective list, in chronological order:
"Shiotani Teikō sakuhin-sen (Selected works of Teikō Shiotani). Pp. 35–42 within Nippon Camera, June 1976. Eight photographs by Shiotani (with a brief note by Shōji Ueda on pp. 130–131).
Attilio Colombo, Isabella Doniselli, Lorenzo Merlo, et al. Fotografia Giapponese dal 1848 ad Oggi. Bologna: Grafis, 1979. . Italian-language book accompanying a travelling exhibition. Pages 96–103 are devoted to "Sadayoshi Shiotani", and show seven of his photographs.
Attilio Colombo, Isabella Doniselli, Lorenzo Merlo, et al. Japanese Photography Today and Its Origin. Bologna: Grafis, 1979. . Book accompanying a travelling exhibition; introductory texts in English and French, other texts in English only. Pages 96–103 are devoted to "Sadayoshi Shiotani", and show seven of his photographs. 
, ed. Fotografie 1922–82 = Photography 1922–82. Cologne: KölnMesse, 1982. . In German and English; catalogue of an exhibition. Pages 223–235 are devoted to Shiotani, showing 31 of his works (24 of which appear on just two pages).
"Fotokina shashinten kara Shiotani Teikō no sekai" = "World of Sadayoshi  Shiotani: From Photokina picture exhibitions 'Photography 1922–1982'." Pp. 23–30 within Nippon Camera, December 1982. Eight photographs by Shiotani (with a brief note by Takao Kajiwara  on p. 121).
 Geijutsu shashin no nenpu ( = The Heritage of Art Photography in Japan. Nihon shashin zenshū = The Complete History of Japanese Photography 2. Tokyo: Shogakukan, 1986. . Despite its alternative English title, virtually all of the book is in Japanese only. Plates 115–120 (pp. 116–120) are by Shiotani.
Photo Metro, March 1988. Contains 13 pages devoted to Shiotani.
Norihiko Matsumoto, ed. A Collection of Japanese Photographs 1912–1940. Tokyo: Shashinkosha, 1990. ; . Despite its English title, the book is in Japanese only. Plates 11, 16, 38 and 40 are by Shiotani. 
Geijutsu shashin no jidai: Yonago Shayūkai kaikoten: Taishō makki – Shōwa shoki (The age of art photography: Retrospective exhibition of the Yonago Photography Circle: From the end of Taishō to early Shōwa). Yonago City Museum of Art, Yonago, Tottori, 1990. Catalogue of an exhibition. Five plates, on pp. 22, 68–69.
Shigeichi Nagano, Kōtarō Iizawa and Naoyuki Kinoshita, eds. Takayama Masataka to Taishō pikutoriarizumu = Takayama Masataka and the Pictorialists of the Taisho Era. Nihon no shashinka 5. Tokyo: Iwanami Shoten, 1998. . Despite its alternative English title, the book is in Japanese only. Plates 24–31 are by Shiotani.
Deborah Klochko, ed. Modern Photography in Japan 1915–1940. San Francisco: The Friends of Photography, 2001. . Catalogue of an exhibition. The plates are not numbered but are alphabetically ordered by photographer; there are four by Shiotani.
. Une saison au Japon. Paris: La Martinière. 2009. . With five photographs by Shiotani.
Japan: Season by Season. New York: Abrams, 2009. . English-language edition, with five photographs by Shiotani (on pp. 351, 356, 359, 364, 365).
"Hikari no tezawari 1929–40-nen: Nihon no kindai shashin (Noguchi Rika sen)" (The touch of light 1929–40: Modern photography of Japan (selected by Rika Noguchi)), pp. 80–113 within Photographica, vol. 21, Spring 2011 (special issue on Rika Noguchi). . Contains seven photographs by Shiotani.

Notes

References

Other books cited
 Kaneko, Ryūichi, and Ivan Vartanian. Japanese Photobooks of the 1960s and '70s. New York: Aperture, 2009. .

 Tucker, Anne Wilkes, et al. The History of Japanese Photography. New Haven, CT: Yale University Press, 2003.  (hardback);  (paperback).

External links
Shiotani Teikō Photo Project, Teiko Shiotani Memorial Photo Gallery (in Japanese)
Kō Ogawa, "Shiotani Teikō san to Okidomari, soshite sofu". About Shiotani, Okidomari, and the writer's grandfather.

Japanese photographers
1899 births
1988 deaths
Artists from Tottori Prefecture